Gofraid mac Fergusa is an alleged ninth-century figure attested by the Annals of the Four Masters and various pedigrees concerning the ancestors of Clann Somhairle and Clann Domhnaill. If the pedigrees are to be believed, he was a son of Fergus mac Eirc, and a descendant of Colla Uais. Likewise, the two annal-entries that note Gofraid mac Fergusa claim that he was an Airgíallan ruler, who aided Cináed mac Ailpín in 835, and died sixteen years later as a ruler of the Isles. Gofraid mac Fergusa's place in the aforesaid pedigrees is chronologically impossible. The events associated with him by the annals are not supported by any contemporary or near contemporary source. In fact, the two annal-entries that recount these alleged events are fabricated additions inserted into the chronicle at some point before the mid seventeenth century.

As a genealogical construct, Gofraid mac Fergusa may represent Clann Somhairle's matrilineal descent from Gofraid Crobán. The latter was the eponym of the Crovan dynasty, a family from which Clann Somhairle dynasts derived their claims to the kingship of the Isles. Both kindreds vied for control of the Isles in the twelfth- and thirteenth centuries. Praise poetry pre-dating the first notice of Gofraid mac Fergusa indicates that Clann Somhairle's descent from a man named Gofraid was indeed highly regarded in the thirteenth century. The chronology of the evolution of this Gofraid into Gofraid mac Fergusa is unknown. The latter's constructed descent from Fergus mac Eirc, and fabricated connections with Cináed mac Ailpín, suggest that he was crafted as a means to connect Clann Domhnaill with the earliest history of the Scottish realm.

Traditional genealogical figure

There are over a dozen sources dating from at least the eighteenth century which outline the traditional ancestry of Somairle mac Gilla Brigte, eponymous ancestor of Clann Somhairle, a mediaeval kindred composed of three main branches: Clann Dubhghaill, Clann Ruaidhrí, and Clann Domhnaill. The earliest source relating to Somairle's ancestry is a pedigree which seems to date to the fourteenth century. Although these sources vary in outlining Somairle's ancestry, many of them refer to a certain Gofraid mac Fergusa (Gofraid, son of Fergus). This man's father, Fergus, is generally presented by these pedigrees as the son of a man named Erc, indicating that this Fergus represents the fifth-century Fergus mac Eirc, a legendary King of Dál Riata. The aforesaid sources generally continue on for several generations reaching to Colla Uais, a legendary Irish king, and traditional ancestor of the Uí Macc Uais lineage of the Airgíalla.

The number of generations between Somairle, Fergus mac Eirc, and Colla Uais are far too few to represent an accurate genealogy, suggesting that the latter two legendary figures were inserted into the lineage. In fact, Somairle's ancestry can only be corroborated as far back as his grandfather. The generations separating this man's father from Gofraid mac Fergusa vary considerably and contain unusual names. Besides Somairle's father and grandfather, the only figures that can be otherwise attested outside of these traditional pedigrees are Colla Uais (and Colla Uais' immediate descendants), Fergus mac Eirc, and Gofraid mac Fergusa.

Spurious annalistic attestations

Gofraid mac Fergusa is noted twice by the Annals of the Four Masters. One entry is dated 834. Although the other is dated 851, this entry appears lumped together with entries corresponding to events dated to 853 in other sources. The first entry identifies Gofraid mac Fergusa as a chieftain of the Airgíalla, and states that he went to Alba to support Dál Riata, at the behest of Cináed mac Ailpín (died 858). The second entry styles Gofraid mac Fergusa chief of  whilst reporting his death. There are several reasons to doubt the historical accuracy of these annal-entries. For example, the name  is a Gaelic form of an Old Norse name, whilst the name  is Gaelic. Although these names could be indicative of mixed ancestry of a bearer, the early ninth century seems to be extremely early for such intermingling amongst the upper classes, especially for an alleged leading member of the Airgíalla, a population group located in north-central Ireland. In fact, the name  is not attested amongst the Irish or Norse in any uninterpolated Irish source for the ninth century. Certainly, a Gofraid son of Fergus is otherwise unrecorded amongst the Airgíalla, nor is such a figure otherwise attested by any contemporary or near-contemporary source. Furthermore, there is no contemporary or near-contemporary record of Cináed ruling before 842, and it is not until the late thirteenth century when a source—the Chronicle of Huntingdon—erroneously dates the outset of his reign to 834. This particular miscalculation was further propagated in the late fourteenth century by the influential Chronica gentis Scotorum of John Fordun (died 1363). Another issue concerning the entries is the fact that the term  ("the Islands of the Foreigners") is an anachronism during for the period in question, and is otherwise first attested by an historical source in the tenth century.

Yet another spurious entry concerns the aforesaid Somairle. Historically, this king is known to have been killed in 1164. The Annals of the Four Masters misdates his death, reporting it eighty-one years earlier, in 1083. There is evidence indicating that this entry is connected with the two concerning Gofraid mac Fergusa. For instance, all three are single sentences tacked to the end of rather long annal-entries, which could be evidence that they were inserted into the annals together. Furthermore, these three entries appear to be synchronised within eighty-one years of three historical events recorded by other sources. For example, the Annals of Ulster reveals that Gofraid ua Ímair (died 934) died two hundred and thirty years before Somairle's death, whereas the Annals of the Four Masters places Gofraid mac Fergusa's death two hundred and thirty years before its misdated death of Somairle. Additionally, the latter source places Gofraid mac Fergusa's death sixteen years after it reports his arrival in Alba from Ireland, whilst the Annals of Ulster reports Gofraid ua Ímair's death sixteen years after his own arrival in Britain from Ireland.

Evolution of a genealogical construct

Quite how Gofraid mac Fergusa became synchronised with the historical Gofraid ua Ímair is unknown. It could well have taken place between the fourteenth- and the seventeenth centuries. As such, the chronology of Gofraid mac Fergusa's construction may be bounded between the propagation of Cináed's miscalculated accession in the 1380s, and the final compilation of the Annals of the Four Masters in the 1630s. What is more certain is that the twelfth- and thirteenth-century members of Clann Somhairle derived their claim to the kingship of the Isles through their descent from Somairle's wife, Ragnailt, daughter of Amlaíb mac Gofraid (died 1153). Ragnailt and her father were members of the Crovan dynasty, descended from Gofraid Crobán (died 1095), the dynasty's founder. Gofraid Crobán's position at the apex of the Crovan dynasty and Clann Somhairle—two competing kindreds that vied for control of the Isles—could indicate that he is the Gofraid referred to in the earliest evidence of a Clann Somhairle ancestor bearing the name. These references to Gofraid, and the "seed" or "race" of Gofraid, survive in two thirteenth-century compositions of epic praise poetry pre-dating the first attestation of Gofraid mac Fergusa.

The reasons behind Gofraid Crobán's apparent transformation into Gofraid mac Fergusa are uncertain. One possibility is that later unease of a matrilineal descent from the Gofraid of the praise poetry led to the assumption of a patrilineal link with him. Another aspect of the transformation could have concerned a conscious rejection of Gofraid Crobán, which in turn may have led to the adoption of a genealogical link to a similarly-named historical figure like Gofraid ua Ímair. A deliberate disavowal of Gofraid Crobán could have stemmed from a slackening of pride in Clann Domhnaill's supposedly less-than-Gaelic ancestors. Another factor may have concerned the clan's continuous incorporation into the Scottish realm. As such, it is conceivable that Gofraid mac Fergusa was first put forth as an ancestor in the context of Clann Domhnaill's patriotic support of the Bruce cause during the Wars of Scottish Independence. Alternately, the formulation of the doctored annal-entries could date as late as the seventeenth century, and could have been concocted in the context of a legal dispute between Randal MacDonnell (died 1636) and a certain George Crawford. This case concerned claims to Rathlin Island, and featured genealogical evidence designed to bolster this MacDonnell chieftain's defence. In any event, the constructed link with Fergus mac Eirc presented by the pedigrees, and the fabricated connection with Cináed mac Ailpín preserved by the annals, seems to reveal that members of Clann Domhnaill wished to be closely associated with the earliest history of the Scottish realm. As such the kindred could claim a pedigree equal to that of the Scottish kings themselves.

Notes

Citations

References

Primary sources

Secondary sources

9th-century rulers of the Kingdom of the Isles
People whose existence is disputed